Leptospermum purpurascens, commonly known as the purple-stemmed turkey bush, is a shrub or small tree that is endemic to far north Queensland. It has bark that is purple when new, elliptical to broadly lance-shaped leaves, relatively small white flowers arranged in pairs and small fruit that falls from the plants when the seeds are released.

Description
Younger stems are hairy at first and have a conspicuous flange near each leaf base.

Taxonomy and naming
Leptospermum purpurascens was first formally described in 1989 by Joy Thompson in the journal Telopea. The specific epithet (purpurascens) is a Latin word meaning "purplish" or "becoming purple", referring to the colour of the new bark.

Distribution and habitat
This tea-tree grows on rocky hillsides in far north Queensland.

Conservation status
This species is classified as "least concern" under the Queensland Government Nature Conservation Act 1992.

Use in horticulture
This species prefers moist, well-drained soil but is frost tender.

References

External links
Leptospermum purpurascens occurrence data from Australasian Virtual Herbarium

purpurascens
Myrtales of Australia
Flora of Queensland
Plants described in 1989
Taxa named by Joy Thompson